Oppian, also known as Oppian of Anazarbus, of Corycus, or of Cilicia, was a 2nd-century Greco-Roman poet during the reign of the emperors Marcus Aurelius and Commodus, who composed the Halieutica, a five-book didactic epic on fishing.

Biography
Oppian states that he is from 'the city of Hermes' and the 'city at the promontory of Sarpedon'. This has been supplemented by information from the biographies attached to medieval manuscripts, which state that his birthplace was  Caesarea (now known as Anazarbus) or Corycus in Cilicia, or Corycus according to the Suda. All these cities were in the Roman province of Cilicia.

He composed a didactic poem in Greek hexameter on fishing. It is about 3500 lines and bears a dedication to Marcus Aurelius and his son Commodus, placing it to the time of their joint rule (176-180 AD).

A later didactic poem on hunting, the Cynegetica, was also attributed to Oppian. For that reason, its anonymous poet is generally referred to as Pseudo-Oppian or Oppian of Apamea. Furthermore, a didactic poem on bird catching, Ixeutica, which now only survives in a prose paraphrase, was also attributed to Oppian in the manuscript tradition. The Ixeutica is now thought to describe a work composed by the Dionysus whom the Suda mention as the author of a treatise on rocks. A likely explanation for the attribution of all these works to Oppian is that the three didactic poems on hunting, fishing, and fowling were at some point circulated as a complementary trio.

According to the anonymous biographies attached to the Byzantine manuscripts of the Halieutica, Oppian's father, having incurred the displeasure of a colleague of Marcus Aurelius named Lucius Verus by neglecting to pay his respects to him when he visited Rome, was banished to Malta. Oppian, who had accompanied his father into exile, returned after the death of Verus  and presented his poems to Marcus Aurelius, who was so pleased with them that he gave the author a piece of gold for each line, took him into favor, and pardoned his father. Oppian subsequently returned to his native country but died of the plague shortly afterwards at the early age of thirty. His contemporaries erected a statue in his honor, with an inscription which is still extant, containing a lament for his premature death and a eulogy of his precocious genius.

The Halieutica
The Halieutica consists of five books, which can be divided into two parts: books 1-2 describe the behaviour of fish and other marine animals, books 3-5 contain various fishing techniques. The content of the Halieutica is not sufficient to serve as a practical guide for fishing. Instead, the humans and animals described in the work often seem to provide examples of good and bad behaviour. The fish in the Halieutica are depicted in an anthropomorphic fashion, as their behaviour is generally motivated by emotions such as hate, love, greed, jealousy and friendship. The fish are also very frequently the subject of Homeric similes. In many cases, Oppian reverses the Homeric technique: where Homer compares epic heroes with animals, the actions of animals in the Halieutica are often compared to all types of human behaviour.

The content of the Halieutica is as follows:
 Book 1: after the introduction and dedication of the work to Marcus Aurelius, the first half of the work contains a catalogue of marine animal species, sorted by their habitat (Hal. 1.80-445). The second half describes their reproductive behaviour (Hal. 1.446-797).
 Book 2: this book describes the 'battles' of fish, how predators catch their prey and techniques that fish use to avoid capture by other fish.
 Book 3: the book starts with a description of the preparations for fishing (Hal. 3.29-91). It then describes how fish escape fishermen (Hal. 3.92-168). The main portion of the book contains various techniques to capture fish through their gluttony (Hal. 3.169-528), followed by a list of fish that can be caught due to their aggression and ends with tuna fishing (Hal. 3.529-648).
 Book 4: the main theme of this book is fishing through manipulating the love and lust of fish (Hal. 4.1-449). The remainder of the book describes, among other things, frightening fish (Hal. 4.502-634) and fishing with poison (Hal. 4.647-693).
 Book 5: in many ways grand finale of the Halieutica, as it teaches you how to catch the largest animals of the sea, including whales, sharks, and dolphins. The work is concluded by a section on the fatal outcome of sponge diving. (Hal. 5.612-680)

Editions
 , with Latin translation by Laurentius Lippius, Aldine edition, Venice, 1517;
 , ;
 , 1597;
 , 1606;
  (1776);
 F. S. Lehrs (1846);
 U. C. Bussemaker (Scholia, 1849).
 Fajen, F. 'Oppianus. Halieutica (Berlin, 1999)

Translations
 Diaper and Jones (1722, Oxford)
 A. W. Mair (1928).

References

External links
 Oppian's Halieuticks of the Nature of Fishes and Fishing of the Ancients in V. Books, Translated from the Greek, with an Account of Oppian's Life and Writings, and a Catalogue of his Fishes (1722)
Poetae bucolici et didactici. Theocritus, Bion, Moschus, Nicander, Oppianus, Marcellus de piscibus, poeta de herbis, C. Fr. Ameis, F. S. Lehrs (ed.), Parisiis, editore Ambrosio Firmin Didot, 1862, pp. 1-126.
Oppian's works translated at Lacus Curtius.Scholia'''Scholia in Theocritum. Scholia et paraphrases in Nicandrum et Oppianum'', Fr. Dübner, U. Cats Bussemaker (ed.), Parisiis, editore Ambrosio Firmin Didot, 1849, pp. 243-449.

Ancient Greek poets
2nd-century poets